The Muster List, in the a maritime world, is a list of the functions each member of a ship crew is required to perform in case of emergency. It is defined in the Chapter III - Part A of the SOLAS Convention.

The Muster List must be written in both the language of country of the ship registration and at least also in English. In ships where the majority of the crew speaks a 3rd language, the Muster List should also be made available in that language.

For the most part, passengers only come to face with the duties and functions of the crew included in the Muster List during the muster drills.

Maritime safety
International water transport
Maritime transport